Infrared Sightings is a video by the Grateful Dead, consisting of computer animation and other imagery set to music from their album Infrared Roses. It was released on VHS video tape and on laserdisc in 1992, and is 18 minutes long.

Infrared Roses is known to fans as "the all Drums and Space album". Produced by Grateful Dead sound designer Bob Bralove, it contains free form improvisational music recorded live at a number of different Dead concerts.

The visuals for Infrared Sightings combine computer generated images, many of them abstract, with found footage that has been altered or edited in various ways. The video is therefore somewhat reminiscent of the light shows that were projected on large screens at many Grateful Dead concerts.

Track listing
 intro – FreeQuency Beach
 part 1 – Underwatermelons (music: "Riverside Rhapsody")
 part 2 – Synchronations (music: "Post-Modern Highrise Table Top Stomp")
 part 3 – Yes I Kandinsky (music: "Infrared Roses")

Credits

Musicians
 Jerry Garcia – guitar
 Mickey Hart – drums, percussion
 Bill Kreutzmann – drums, percussion
 Phil Lesh – bass
 Brent Mydland – keyboards
 Bob Weir – guitar

With
 Bob Bralove
 Willie Green III

Production
 Len Dell'Amico, Larry Lachman – directors, producers
 Fritz Perlberg – executive producer
 Bob Bralove – music producer
 Maury Rosenfeld — spatio-temporal opto-orchestrator
 Fred Raimondi – visual effects and creative entity
 Sam Hamann – electronic paintmeister
 David Tristram – electropaint graphics programmer/artist
 Steve Burr, "Mad" Johnny Modell – intro sound design
 Quency – special animated appearance

See also
 Grateful Dead: Backstage Pass

References

 
 Infrared Sightings at the Grateful Dead Family Database
 Infrared Sightings at LaserDisc Database
 Scott, John W; Dolgushkin, Mike; Nixon, Stu. DeadBase XI: The Complete Guide to Grateful Dead Song Lists, 1999, DeadBase, p. 122

External links
 Clip from Infrared Sightings on FritzPerlberg.com

Grateful Dead
Concert films
1992 films
1990s English-language films